The California Natural Resources Agency (CNRA) is a state cabinet-level agency in the government of California. The institution and jurisdiction of the Natural Resources Agency is provided for in California Government Code sections 12800 and 12805, et seq. The Agency has six departments, 10 conservancies, 17 boards and commissions, three councils, and one urban park in Los Angeles that consists of two museums, the California Science Center and the California African American museum. Through its 25 departments, conservancies and commissions, the Natural Resources Agency is responsible for protecting prehistory history, natural landscapes and cultural sites, monitoring and stewarding state lands and waterways, and regulating fish and game use, as well as private lands and the intersection with federal lands and waters.

The current Secretary for Natural Resources is Wade Crowfoot, and is a member of Governor Gavin Newsom's cabinet.

History 
150 years ago, most of the state of California's natural resources were under federal jurisdiction, but as the state's population and needs grew, so did a desire for a closer-to-home approach to protecting the state's wildlands and wildlife. These sentiments led to the creation of the Board of Fish Commissioners in 1870 (the first wildlife conservation agency in the country), the Division of Forestry in 1881 (housed within the state's Department of Agriculture) and the Board of Forestry in 1885.

During this same period, federal and state leaders began to set aside land for preservation and public access. President Abraham Lincoln signed a federal law in 1864 that granted Yosemite Valley and Mariposa Big Tree Grove to create California's first state park. In 1901, both land grants were returned to the federal government. A year later in 1902, the state purchased 2,500 acres of redwood forests in Santa Cruz to create Big Basin Redwood State Park, California's longest-running state park.

At the turn of the 20th century, California's emerged on the forefront of the preservation movement by expanding fish and game laws, establishing a state forester to regulate timber harvest, acquiring historical monuments, and passing the Water Commission Act in 1913 to establish the State Water Commission to oversee rights to use surface water.

In 1927, Governor Clement Calhoun Young restructured many of state boards, commissions, divisions, and departments to create the Department of Natural Resources. This new Department included the Division of Forestry, known today as CAL FIRE (created in 1977), and a Division of Beaches and Parks, known today as the Department of State Parks and Recreation (created in 1967).

In 1961, Governor Edmund G. “Pat” Brown reorganized the executive branch and established the Resources Agency to consolidate management of the state's diverse resources. The new agency oversaw the Department of Fish and Game (created in 1951), known today as the Department of Fish and Wildlife (renamed in 2012), Department of Water Resources (created in 1954), Department of Conservation (created in 1961). This restructure also placed most of the state's environmental quality programs within the Resources Agency. In 1991, those environmental quality programs, designed to limit environmental pollution, were placed under a new state agency, the California Environmental Protection Agency.

In 2009, the Resources Agency adopted its current name of the California Natural Resources Agency to better reflect its primary mission of protecting the state's natural resources.

Today, the California Natural Resources Agency stewards 100 million acres of California's land, hundreds of rivers and lakes, and more than 1,000 miles of coastline.

Organization

Departments 

The Natural Resources Agency is the parent department to a number of other departments:

California Department of Conservation
CALFED Bay-Delta Program
California Department of Fish and Wildlife
California Department of Forestry and Fire Protection
California Department of Parks and Recreation
California Department of Water Resources
California Conservation Corps

Commissions
Also included within its jurisdiction are a number of study and regulatory commissions, boards and councils:
California Coastal Commission
California Energy Commission
California State Lands Commission
San Francisco Bay Conservation and Development Commission
Delta Protection Commission
Colorado River Board of California
Central Valley Flood Protection Board
Board of Forestry
Fish and Game Commission
Mining and Geology Board
Native American Heritage Commission
Parks and Recreation Commission
State Historical Resources Commission
State Off-Highway Motor Vehicle Recreation Commission
California Water Commission
California Boating and Waterways Commission
Wildlife Conservation Board
California Advisory Committee on Geographic Names

Conservancies
 Baldwin Hills Conservancy
 California Tahoe Conservancy
 Coachella Valley Mountains Conservancy
 Sacramento-San Joaquin Delta Conservancy
 San Diego River Conservancy
 San Gabriel and Lower Los Angeles Rivers and Mountains Conservancy
 San Joaquin River Conservancy
 Santa Monica Mountains Conservancy
 Sierra Nevada Conservancy
State Coastal Conservancy

Museums
 California Science Center
 California African American Museum

List of Secretaries 
William E. Warne, 1961-1962

Hugo Fisher, 1963-1965

Norman B. Livermore, 1967-1974

Claire T. Dedrick, 1975-1976

Huey D. Johnson, 1977-1982

Gordon K. Van Vleck, 1983-1990

Douglas P. Wheeler, 1991-1999

Mary D. Nichols, 1999-2003

Mike Chrisman, 2003-2010

Lester A. Snow, 2010

John Laird, 2011-2019

Wade Crowfoot, 2019–Present

See also

References

External links
Official  California Natural Resources Agency website
California Secretary for Natural Resources Lester A. Snow's official website

 
Natural Resources Agency
State environmental protection agencies of the United States
Natural resources agencies in the United States